Nepotilla amoena is a species of sea snail, a marine gastropod mollusk in the family Raphitomidae.

Description
The length of the shell attains 8 mm.

Distribution
This marine species occurs off Greenland; Baffin Island, Canada and from Northern Norway to Southwest Sweden.

References

 Gofas, S.; Le Renard, J.; Bouchet, P. (2001). Mollusca, in: Costello, M.J. et al. (Ed.) (2001). European register of marine species: a check-list of the marine species in Europe and a bibliography of guides to their identification. Collection Patrimoines Naturels, 50: pp. 180–213

External links
 Biolib.cz: Nepotilla amoena - image
 Sars, G.O. (1878). Bidrag til Kundskaben om Norges arktiske Fauna. I. Mollusca Regionis Arcticae Norvegiae. Oversigt over de i Norges arktiske Region Forekommende Bløddyr. Brøgger, Christiania. xiii + 466 pp., pls 1-34 & I-XVIII., available online at http://www.biodiversitylibrary.org/item/92496 page(s): 220, pl. 17 fig. 10 a-b
 
 Gastropods.com: Nepotilla amoena

amoena
Gastropods described in 1878